This is an inclusive list of science fiction television programs whose names begin with the letter N.

N
Live-action
Návštěvníci a.k.a. The Visitors (1983–2005, Czechoslovakia)
Neighbors, The (2012–2014)
Neverwhere (1996)
New People, The (1969–1970)
Nick Fury: Agent of S.H.I.E.L.D. (1998, film)
Nightflyers (2018)
Night Gallery (1970–1973, anthology)
Night Man (1997–1999)
Night Stalker (franchise):
Night Stalker (2005–2006, Kolchak: The Night Stalker remake)
Kolchak: The Night Stalker (1974–1975)
Night Visions (2001, anthology)
Nightmare Cafe (1992)
Nightmare Man, The (1981, UK)
Nineteen Eighty-Four (1954, UK, film)
No Ordinary Family (2010–2011)
Not Quite Human (franchise):
Not Quite Human (1987, film)
Not Quite Human II (1989, film)
Still Not Quite Human (1992, film)
Not with a Bang (1990, UK)
Now and Again (1999–2000)
Nowhere Man (1995–1996)
Animation
Nadesico (franchise):
Martian Successor Nadesico a.k.a. Mobile Battleship Nadesico a.k.a. Nadesico (1996–1997, Japan, animated)
Gekiganger III (1996–1997, Japan, clips within Martian Successor Nadesico, animated)
Nadia: The Secret of Blue Water (franchise):
Nadia: The Secret of Blue Water a.k.a. Fushigi no Umi no Nadia (1990–1991, Japan, animated)
Nadia: The Secret of Fuzzy (1992, Japan, animated, film)
Nanoboy (franchise):
New Adventures of Nanoboy, The (2009–2010, Canada/Singapore, animated)
Nanoboy: Hero on the Run (2011, Canada/US, sequel, film, animated)
NASCAR Racers (1999–2001, animated)
Needless (2009, Japan, animated)
Neon Genesis Evangelion (1995–1996, Japan, animated)
New Adventures of Ocean Girl, The (2000–2001, Australia, animated)
NieA 7 a.k.a. NieA under 7 (2000, Japan, animated)
Ninja Senshi Tobikage a.k.a. Ninja Robot Tobikage a.k.a. Ninja Robots (US) (1985–1986, Japan, animated)
Noein a.k.a. Noein: To Your Other Self (2005–2006, Japan, animated)
Now and Then, Here and There (1999–2000, Japan, animated)

References

Television programs, N